The Expositiones Vocabulorum Biblie (Exposition of Bible Words) is a hand-written, parchment book in Latin written (or inspired) by the 12th century clergyman William Brito (Guillaume le Breton). It is, in essence, a dictionary. It gives explanations, derivations and etymologies of words, some from Greek or Hebrew, for the most difficult words in the Vulgate Bible. Entries are arranged in alphabetical order, demonstrating William's wide knowledge, many drawn from a range of classical, patristic and medieval writers. 

It is one of the very few documents to survive King Henry VIII's Dissolution of the Monasteries in the 1530s. There is at least one known copy, now owned by the National Trust in Britain and as of April 2013 is on display at Lacock Abbey, Wiltshire.

National Trust copy
The National Trust book is bound (or re-bound) in wooden front and back panels, with leather bindings. It shows signs that it would have originally been chained (for security and safety) in an alcove for common use by people within the Abbey, and originally used to assist with translation of the Bible by the nuns of Lacock Abbey. It is written in maybe four different hands as a collegial work by monks. Various notes and papers specific to Lacock Abbey have been bound into this volume over the years, further linking it to the site.

This volume realised £46,850 at auction in 2011. It was sold at Christie's on 23 November 2011, by the Talbot family that once owned Lacock Abbey, of whom William Henry Fox Talbot is perhaps the best-known member as the inventor the calotype process, a precursor to photographic processes of the 19th and 20th centuries.

Influence
It is known that this dictionary had a wide circulation and was regarded as an essential scholarly tool. In 1284 it was one of the three texts that Archbishop John Pecham instructed Merton College, Oxford, to have for the use and instruction of the poor of the area, chained to one of the desks.

See also
 Mammotrectus super Bibliam

References

External links
 Summa Britonis : sive, Guillelmi Britonis Expositiones vocabulorum Biblie / edited by Lloyd W. Daly and Bernadine A. Daly. Guillelmus Brito, 13th cent. - National Library of Australia "Trove" entry (translation)
 Harley MS 1687 - Expositiones vocabulorum Bibliae, attributed to William Brito and Alexander Neckam, Corrogationes Promethei, British Library, Manuscript 1687

13th-century Latin books
13th-century Christian texts